The Huawei Matebook X Pro is a laptop designed and produced by Huawei. It is part of the Huawei MateBook line of laptops, and has been compared to Apple's MacBook, both in design and interface.

Release 
The Huawei Matebook X Pro laptop was first announced at MWC 2018. An updated version was announced at MWC 2019, but was sold in China only until end of 2019. The model of 2020 was advertised at "Huawei Consumer Business Product and Strategy Virtual Launch" due to cancellation of MWC.

Features

Software 
The Huawei Matebook X Pro ships with Windows 10 (Home or Pro), Microsoft's personal computer operating system.

Hardware 
The Huawei Matebook X Pro is the first laptop in Huawei's lineup to feature what the company is calling "FullView" design, giving the laptop a screen to body ratio of 91%. The display is a 13.9-inch LTPS touchscreen with an aspect ratio of 3:2. The resolution is 3000 × 2000 at 260 PPI with a claimed viewing angle of 178 degrees and a maximum brightness of 450 nits.

In North America the laptop comes in two configurations with the base model using an 8th-generation Intel Core i5-8250U processor with 8 GB of RAM, 256 GB of SSD storage and Intel UHD Graphics 620 while the higher-end model packs an 8th-generation Intel Core i7-8550U processor with 16 GB of RAM, 512 GB of SSD storage and a dedicated NVIDIA GeForce MX150 with 2 GB GDDR5 memory.

Reception 
The Huawei Matebook X Pro received positive reviews.

Dan Seifert from "The Verge" praised the laptop's display, performance and design saying "Huawei’s new MateBook X Pro is the best laptop right now." Seifert also compares the keyboard of the Matebook X Pro to Apple's MacBook Pro saying "The keyboard has low travel (1.22mm), but it’s not as low profile or annoying to type on as the keyboard on a MacBook Pro."

Daniel Rubino from "Windows Central" also compared the Matebook X Pro to Apple's MacBook Pro noting, "It may look like a MacBook Pro, but Huawei's latest goes beyond our expectations." concluding that the Matebook X Pro is "An excellent performer with few drawbacks."

Technical specifications

References 

Huawei laptops
Computer-related introductions in 2018